Next Album is an album by jazz saxophonist Sonny Rollins, his first to be released on the Milestone label, featuring performances by Rollins with George Cables, Jack DeJohnette, Bob Cranshaw and Arthur Jenkins. The cover photography was credited to Chuck Stewart.

Reception 

The Allmusic review by Scott Yanow states: "Sonny Rollins first album after ending his six-year retirement is a particularly strong effort. The highpoint is a ten-minute version of 'Skylark' that has a long unaccompanied section by the great tenor."

Track listing 
All compositions by Sonny Rollins except as indicated
 "Playin' in the Yard" – 10:25
 "Poinciana" (Buddy Bernier, Nat Simon) – 9:58
 "The Everywhere Calypso" – 7:54
 "Keep Hold of Yourself" – 4:30
 "Skylark" (Hoagy Carmichael, Johnny Mercer) – 10:17
 Recorded at Mercury Sound Studios, NYC, July 14 (tracks 1 and 3) and 27 (tracks 2 and 4–6), 1972

Personnel 
 Sonny Rollins – tenor saxophone, soprano saxophone (track 2)
 George Cables – electric piano (tracks 1 and 2), piano
 Bob Cranshaw – bass, electric bass (track 1)
 David Lee – drums
 Jack DeJohnette – drums (tracks 1 and 4)
 Arthur Jenkins – congas, percussion (tracks 1 and 3)

References 

1972 albums
Milestone Records albums
Sonny Rollins albums
Albums produced by Orrin Keepnews